Goslings may refer to:

Goslings Bank, a historical British banking firm, now Barclays Fleet Street branch
Gosling's Ginger Beer, a brand name for Ginger Beer
Gosling's Rum, a Bermuda-based brand name
The Goslings, a drone rock band

See also
Gosling (disambiguation)